Cameron Wright may refer to:

 Cameron Wright (weapons scientist) (1901–1979), Welsh weapons scientist during World War II
 Cameron Wright (athlete) (born 1972), retired American high jumper
 Cameron Wright (rugby union) (born 1994), South African rugby union player
 Cameron Wright (footballer) (born 1968), Australian rules footballer